Butouxiang Miao Ethnic Township is a rural ethnic township in Xinhuang Dong Autonomous County, Hunan, China. Miao and Dong people accounted for 48.5% and 44.5% of the total population respectively. It borders Bozhou Town in the northwest, Zhijiang Dong Autonomous County in the northeast and east, Mibei Miao Ethnic Township in the south, Zhongzhai Town in the southwest, and Hetan Town in the west.

History
Before 1955 it belonged to Baihe Township of Zhijiang Dong Autonomous County. In 1956 it came under the jurisdiction of Xinhuang Dong Autonomous County and the Butouxiang Township was established. In September 1958, it was renamed "Butouxiang People's Commune". In June 1984, its name was changed to "Butouxiang Miao Ethnic Township".

Administrative division
As of 2015, the township is divided into 14 villages: Gubaxi, Tuluping, Youxi, Xinjiang, Leijiatian, Tianlei, Huaikou, Chashan, Laixi, Tuixi, Dabingxi, Huangyang, and Butouxiang.

Geography

The forest coverage of this town is 91.45%.

There are nine streams in the township. Xinjiang Stream, a tributary of the Qingshui River, winds through the township.

A small part of the Guzhao Reservoir is in this town.

Economy
The local economy is primarily based upon agriculture and local industry. Wood processing is a major industry.

Education
There are one ordinary middle school, one central primary school and 14 village primary schools in this township.

Transportation
The G60 Shanghai–Kunming Expressway passes across the northern township east to west.

References

Xinhuang
Miao ethnic townships